Mariame Sylla (born March 20, 1986) is an Ivorian female professional basketball player.

External links
Profile at afrobasket.com

1986 births
Living people
Ivorian women's basketball players